The 2014 United States Senate election in Texas was held on November 4, 2014, to elect a member of the United States Senate. Incumbent Republican senator and Senate Minority Whip John Cornyn ran for re-election to a third term. Primary elections were held on March 4, 2014. Since no Democratic candidate received over 50% in the first round of the primary, a runoff election was required on May 27, 2014. David Alameel, who came in first in the primary, won the runoff and became his party's nominee. In the general election, Cornyn defeated Alameel in a landslide.

Republican primary 
In February 2014, Republican Senate Minority Leader Mitch McConnell was featured in a controversial television advertisement by Dwayne Stovall. Stovall belittled McConnell, Cornyn's superior in the Senate leadership, as an ineffective "Beltway turtle" who is out-of-touch with the party rank-and-file. Until the controversial advertisement, the media had largely ignored Stovall's candidacy.

Candidates

Declared 
 Curt Cleaver, hotel industry consultant and candidate for the U.S. Senate in 2012
 Ken Cope, aerospace executive and retired United States Army Lieutenant Colonel
 John Cornyn, incumbent U.S. Senator
 Chris Mapp, businessman
 Reid Reasor, Tea Party activist
 Steve Stockman, U.S. Representative
 Dwayne Stovall, bridge construction contractor, school board member from Cleveland and candidate for the State House of Representatives in 2012
 Linda Vega, attorney and immigration activist

Withdrew 
 Erick Wyatt, U.S. Army veteran

Declined 
 Greg Abbott, Texas Attorney General (running for Governor)
 David Barton, author, minister and former vice chair of the Republican Party of Texas
 David Dewhurst, Lieutenant Governor of Texas (running for re-election)
 Louie Gohmert, U.S. Representative (running for re-election)
 Debra Medina, activist and candidate for Governor in 2010 (ran for Comptroller of Public Accounts)

Endorsements

Polling

Results 

Because Cornyn surpassed a majority in the primary, he faced no runoff election. Cornyn's winning percent and margin of victory were the lowest by any Texas Republican U.S. Senator in a primary election in state history.

Democratic primary

Candidates

Declared 
 David Alameel, businessman and candidate for Texas's 33rd congressional district in 2012
 Michael Fjetland, businessman, Independent candidate for Texas's 22nd congressional district in 2004 and Republican candidate for the seat in 2006
 HyeTae "Harry" Kim, physician
 Kesha Rogers, Worldwide LaRouche Youth Movement activist and nominee for Texas's 22nd congressional district in 2010 and 2012
 Maxey Scherr, attorney

Declined 
 Wendy Davis, state senator (running for governor)
 Bill White, former mayor of Houston and nominee for governor in 2010

Endorsements

Polling

Results 

Because no candidate received over 50% of the vote in the primary, the two with the most votes – David Alameel and Kesha Rogers – advanced to a runoff on May 27.

Libertarian convention

Candidates

Declared 
 Rebecca Paddock, electrical engineer
 Tanuja Paruchuri, holistic wellness coach
 Jon Roland, computer programmer and nominee for Texas Attorney General in 2002, 2006 and 2010

Results 
Rebecca Paddock won the nomination.

Green nomination

Candidates

Declared 
 Emily Marie Sanchez

Results 
Sanchez won the nomination.

General election

Debates 
 Compete video of debate, October 24, 2014

Predictions

Polling 

With Castro

With Davis

With Parker

With White

Results

See also 
 2014 United States Senate elections
 2014 United States elections
 2014 United States House of Representatives elections in Texas
 2014 Texas gubernatorial election

References

External links 
Official campaign websites (Archived)
 John Cornyn
 David Alameel
 Curt Cleaver
 Michael Fjetland
 Chris Mapp
 Reid Reasor
 Kesha Rogers
 Jon Roland
 Maxey Scherr
 Steve Stockman
 Dwayne Stovall
 Linda Vega
 Rebecca Paddock
 U.S. Senate elections in Texas, 2014 at Ballotpedia
 Campaign contributions at OpenSecrets

Texas
2014
United States Senate